In a 2000 paper titled "Generalized Schmidt Decomposition and Classification of Three-Quantum-Bit States" Acín et al. described a way of separating out one of the terms of a general tripartite quantum state. This can be useful in considering measures of entanglement of quantum states.

General decomposition 
For a general three-qubit state there is no way of writing

but there is a general transformation to where .

References

Quantum mechanics